Simrishamn Municipality is a municipality in Skåne County in southern Sweden. Its seat is located in the city  Simrishamn.

The creation of the present municipality took place during the last of the two nationwide municipal reforms carried out in Sweden during the second half of the 20th century. In 1969 a number of surrounding rural municipalities were merged with the City of Simrishamn. The enlarged city became a municipality of unitary type in 1971 and in 1974 more territory was added. The number of original entities (pre-1952) is twenty.

Geography 
The landscape south and west of Simrishamn is mainly open and flat farmland. To the north of Simrishamn the landscape is broken up by small forests and gently sloping hills. The coastline directly south and north of Simrishamn is stony. Stenshuvud National Park is located by the shore, within the municipal borders. Simrishamn is located in the Österlen area.

Localities 
There are 13 urban areas (also called tätorter or localities) in Simrishamn Municipality. In the table they are listed according to the size of the population as of December 31, 2005. The municipal seat is in bold characters.

Minor localities 
There are 14 minor localities (also called småorter) in Simrishamn Municipality. In the table they are listed according to the size of the population as of December 31, 2005.

* Counted together

Politics
The 2018 municipal election resulted in the following composition of the municipal council:

International relations

Twin towns — Sister cities
The municipality is twinned with:
  Barth
  Bornholm
  Kołobrzeg
  Palanga

References 
 Statistics Sweden

External links 

 Simrishamn - Official site
 Österlen - Official site
 Österlen & Ystad - Official site

Municipalities of Skåne County